is a manga series written and illustrated by Yuki Yoshihara, serialized in Petit Comic and published by Shogakukan in bound volumes between 2006 and 2009. It is about a young woman, Choko, whose family lost their money, and her entry into the office lady workforce, working for her former servant and childhood crush, Domoto. It was licensed in English by Viz Media, in Taiwanese by Tong Li Publishing, and in French by Soleil Productions.

Release

Reception
Deb Aoki describes the manga as "spicing up" shōjo manga humour and plot conventions, but found the portrayal of sexual harassment off-putting, and felt that readers looking for sex scenes would be better served with yaoi. Nick Smith felt that although it was well written, there were many offensive scenes in the first volume, and noted the erratic behaviour of Domoto. Leroy Douresseaux describes it as " a high school romance masquerading as an adult, workplace romantic comedy and drama".  Alexander Hoffman praised the humour in the relationship, and enjoyed the secondary cast. Casey Brienza compared the funny, yet not idealistic depiction of Choko's working life to the depiction of Sumire's in Tramps Like Us, and feels that the sexual harassment shown in the series is not condoned by it.  Katherine Dacey praised the manga's "elegant artwork", "colorful supporting cast and melodramatic plot twists", but was disappointed at the use of the "stalker-as-great-romantic-prospect trope". Johanna Draper Carlson felt that it was necessary to understand some aspects of Japanese culture in order to fully appreciate the work. Melinda Beasi felt that the characters became more sympathetic, and their situation more humorous, as the first volume progressed.

References

External links

2006 manga
Josei manga
Romantic comedy anime and manga
Shogakukan manga
Viz Media manga